The Apostolic Nunciature to Armenia is an ecclesiastical office of the Catholic Church in Armenia. It is a diplomatic mission of the Holy See, whose representative is called the Apostolic Nuncio with the rank of an ambassador.

History
Armenia and the Holy See established diplomatic relations on 20 September 1992.

The Holy See, represented by Archbishop Edgar Peña Parra, inaugurated a new building in central Yerevan to house the nunciature in October 2021.

Representatives of the Holy See to Armenia
Apostolic nuncios
Jean-Paul Gobel (7 December 1993 – 6 December 1997)
Peter Stephan Zurbriggen (13 June 1998 – 25 October 2001)
Claudio Gugerotti (7 December 2001 – 15 July 2011)
Marek Solczyński (15 December 2011 – 25 April 2017)
José Avelino Bettencourt (1 March 2018 – present)

See also

Catholic Church in Armenia
Foreign relations of Armenia
Foreign relations of the Holy See
List of diplomatic missions of the Holy See

References

External links
 Apostolic Nunciature to Armenia on Twitter

Armenia
Holy See
 
Armenia–Holy See relations